was a town located in the former Shima District, Mie Prefecture, Japan.

As of 2003, the town had an estimated population of 8,154 and a density of 632.09 persons per km2. The total area was 12.90 km2.

On October 1, 2004, Daiō, along with the towns of Shima (former), Ago, Hamajima and Isobe (all from Shima District), was merged to create the city of Shima and no longer exists as an independent municipality.

External links
 Official website of Shima

Dissolved municipalities of Mie Prefecture